The White Reindeer is a 1952 Finnish horror drama film directed by Erik Blomberg in his feature film debut. It was entered in competition at the 1953 Cannes Film Festival and earned the Jean Cocteau-led jury special award for Best Fairy Tale Film. After its limited release five years later in the United States, it was one of five films to win the 1956 Golden Globe Award for Best Foreign Film.

Plot
The film, based on pre-Christian Finnish mythology and Sami shamanism, is set in Finnish Lapland and centers on a young woman, Pirita. In the snowy landscape, Pirita and reindeer herder Aslak meet and soon marry. Aslak must spend time away for work, leaving his new bride lonely. In an effort to alleviate her loneliness and ignite marital passion, Pirita visits the local shaman, who indeed helps her out; but in the process turns her into a shapeshifting, vampiric white reindeer.  The villages' men are drawn to her and pursue her, with tragic results.

Cast
 Mirjami Kuosmanen as Pirita and as Maarita, Pirita's mother
 Kalervo Nissilä as Aslak
 Åke Lindman as forest ranger
 Arvo Lehesmaa as Tsalkku-Nilla, shaman
 Jouni Tapiola as reindeer herder
 Tyyne Haarla as older woman (uncredited)
 Pentti Irjala as the speaker (uncredited)
 Edvin Kajanne as reindeer herder (uncredited)
 Kauko Laurikainen as man in Laplander's hut (uncredited)
 Heimo Lepistö as wealthy man (uncredited)
 Osmo Osva as reindeer herder (uncredited)
 Aarne Tarkas as the groom (uncredited)
 Inke Tarkas as the bride (uncredited)
 Evald Terho as Pirita’s father (uncredited)
 Kaarlo Wilska as reindeer herder (uncredited)

Release

Theatrical release
The White Reindeer was released theatrically outside Finland in at least 11 countries, including the United States, Sweden and France.

Home media
The film was released on VHS in Finland in 1990; and in the 2010s, DVDs were released in Finland and France. A 4K restoration from the original camera negative was realized in 2016–2017 by the National Audiovisual Institute of Finland and was released on Blu-ray with Swedish and English subtitles. On April 8, 2019, Region 2 DVDs and Blu-ray disks were released by Eureka Entertainment, as a part of its "Masters of Cinema" series.

Reception

International reception
The White Reindeer received mostly positive reviews from critics outside of Finland, with many praising the film's atmosphere, cinematography, and haunting imagery.
J. Hoberman from The Village Voice gave the film a positive review, calling it "a quasi-ethnographic exercise in magic neorealism". Hoberman also commended the film for its "terse delivery and stark premise". Jeremy Aspinall from Radio Times rated the film four out of five stars, praising the film's documentary-style cinematography, which he felt effectively captured Finland's snow-filled landscape, haunting imagery, and Kuosmanen's performance. Starburst Magazines James Evans awarded the film a score of nine out of ten stars, calling it "a remarkable, beautiful, and compelling film that is fascinatingly rooted in Lapland mythology and Sámi practices"; highlighting the film's story, dream-like cinematography, and Kuosmanen's performance.

Maitland McDonagh from TV Guide awarded the film 3 out of 5 stars, criticizing the film for being awkward in some parts while praising the cinematography, and haunting imagery. McDonagh concluded her review by calling it "A must-see for horror completists, and one of the few films to explore Sami folkloric traditions."

Awards
 Cannes Film Festival 1953: Best fairy-tale film
 Golden Globe 1956: Best foreign-language film

References

Bibliography

External links
 
 
 
 Valkoinen peura (The White Reindeer) at Elonet

1952 films
1952 drama films
1950s fantasy films
1952 horror films
Best Foreign Language Film Golden Globe winners
1950s Finnish-language films
Finnish black-and-white films
Films directed by Erik Blomberg
Films about shapeshifting
Films about animals
Films about deer and moose
Films set in Lapland
Finnish fantasy films
Finnish horror films
Folk horror films
Horror drama films